Frank Sheridan may refer to:
 Frank Sheridan (actor) (1869–1943), American actor 
 Frank Sheridan (pianist) (1898–1962), American classical pianist